Úmyslovice is a municipality and village in Nymburk District in the Central Bohemian Region of the Czech Republic. It has about 300 inhabitants.

Administrative parts
The village of Ostrov is an administrative part of Úmyslovice.

Geography
It lies in a flat agricultural landscape in the Central Elbe Table.

History
The first written mention of Úmyslovice is from 1291. The village continuously belonged to the Poděbrady estate until the establishment of the independent municipality in 1850.

Sights
The landmark of Úmyslovice is the Church of Saint Leonard. The church was built in 1729–1732, then it was completely rebuilt in the Neoclassical style in 1812. Neogothic modifications were made at the end of the 19th century.

References

External links

Villages in Nymburk District